Banque Populaire ("People's Bank") is a French group of cooperative banks part of Groupe BPCE. The central entity is controlled by 15 independent regional banks and also operated under the CASDEN and the Crédit Coopératif subsidiaries.

In 2006, Groupe Banque Populaire created Natixis with another French cooperative banking group, Groupe Caisse d'Epargne, to which they brought Banque Populaire's Natexis and Caisse d'Epargne's IXIS Corporate and Investment Bank.

In 2009, Banque Populaire and Caisse d'Epargne merged to form Groupe BPCE.

Merger
In October 2008 the group announced plans, since approved by the French government, to merge with Groupe Caisse d'Epargne. The companies merged in 2009 to form the Groupe BPCE and retain their separate retail banking brands and branch networks. Banque Populaire's chief executive officer Philippe Dupont has been nominated to head the enlarged company.

As of December 2008, Banque Populaire had:
 3,460,000 shareholders
 9,400,000 customers
 3,391 branches in France
 a 70 countries presence

References

External links 

Groupe Banque Populaire Caisse d'Epargne
Banque Populaire website (in french)

Banks established in 1878
BPCE